Efraín Díaz (born 12 June 1904, date of death unknown) was a Chilean sabre fencer. He competed at the 1928 and 1936 Summer Olympics.

References

External links
 

1904 births
Year of death missing
Chilean male sabre fencers
Olympic fencers of Chile
Fencers at the 1928 Summer Olympics
Fencers at the 1936 Summer Olympics
20th-century Chilean people